Amin-Salim Jarjora (1886 –  20 August 1975) was a Christian Israeli Arab politician who served as a member of the Knesset for the Democratic List of Nazareth between 1949 and 1951.

Biography
Born in Nazareth, Jarjora attended law school in Jerusalem. A teacher at the Russian School in his hometown, he served in the Ottoman Army during World War I. After the war he became a lecturer, working at the El-Rashidia College in Jerusalem between 1922 and 1926. He also worked as a lawyer in Haifa and Nazareth.

In the first Knesset elections in 1949, Jarjora was placed second on the Democratic List of Nazareth party, which won two seats. He was placed second on the Agriculture and Development list for the 1951 elections, losing his seat as the party won only one seat.

He became mayor of Nazareth in 1954, a position he held until 1960.

References

External links

1886 births
1975 deaths
Politicians from Nazareth
Ottoman military personnel of World War I
Arab people in Mandatory Palestine
Israeli schoolteachers
Arab members of the Knesset
Mayors of Nazareth
Democratic List of Nazareth politicians
Arabs in Ottoman Palestine
Members of the 1st Knesset (1949–1951)
20th-century Israeli lawyers